Dalbergia spinosa is a species of thorny liana (or self-supporting tree to 15 m), with the Vietnamese name trắc gai.  The genus Dalbergia is placed in the subfamily Faboideae and tribe Dalbergieae; no subspecies are listed in the Catalogue of Life.

References

External links

 
Flora of Indo-China
Flora of India (region)